Zelda II: The Adventure of Link is an action role-playing video game with platforming elements developed and published by Nintendo. It is the second installment in the Legend of Zelda series and was released in Japan for the Famicom Disk System on January 14, 1987—less than one year after the Japanese release and seven months before the North American release of the original The Legend of Zelda. Zelda II was released in North America and the PAL region for the Nintendo Entertainment System in late 1988, almost two years after its initial release in Japan.

The Adventure of Link is a direct sequel to the original The Legend of Zelda, again involving the protagonist Link, on a quest to save Princess Zelda, who has fallen under a sleeping spell. The game's emphasis on side-scrolling and role-playing elements is a significant departure from its predecessor. For much of the series' three-decade history, the game technically served as the only sequel to the original game, as all other entries in the series are either prequels or occur in an alternative reality, according to the official Zelda timeline. This changed with the 2017 release of The Legend of Zelda: Breath of the Wild, which serves as the latest chapter in the overall continuity.

The game was a critical and financial success and introduced elements such as Link's "magic meter" and the Dark Link character that would become commonplace in future Zelda games, although the role-playing elements, such as experience points and limited lives have not been used since in canonical games. The Adventure of Link was followed by The Legend of Zelda: A Link to the Past for the Super Nintendo Entertainment System in 1991.

Gameplay
Zelda II: The Adventure of Link is an action role-playing game, bearing little resemblance to the first or later entries in the Legend of Zelda series. It features side-scrolling areas within a larger top-down world map, rather than the mostly top-down perspective of the previous game, which only uses side-scrolling in a few dungeon basement areas. The side-scrolling gameplay and experience system are similar to features of the Castlevania series, especially Castlevania II: Simon's Quest. The game incorporates a strategic combat system, a proximity continue system based on lives, an experience points system, magic spells, and more interaction with non-player characters. Apart from the non-canonical CD-i The Legend of Zelda games, Link: The Faces of Evil and Zelda: The Wand of Gamelon, no other game in the series includes a life feature. The side angle is occasionally seen in Link's Awakening and the other Game Boy entries, which rely primarily on the top-down view.

Experience levels
In this installment, Link gains experience points to upgrade his attack, magic, and life by defeating enemies. He can raise each of these attributes to a maximum of eight levels. Raising a life level will decrease the damage Link receives when hit, raising a magic level will decrease the magic points cost of spells, and raising an attack level will strengthen his sword's offensive power. In the Western version of the game, each attribute requires a different amount of experience to level up, with the life level requiring the fewest points to level and attack requiring the most. When enough points are acquired to raise an attribute, the player may choose to level up that attribute or to cancel and continue gaining experience points towards the next level in another attribute. In the original Japanese version, all attributes require the same number of experience points to level up, and the required number is lower, but if the player loses all of his lives, the levels of all attributes will be reset to the lowest of the three (while level upgrades in the Western version are permanent). Once Link has raised an attribute to the maximum level of eight, further advances in that attribute will earn Link an extra life, without advancing the attribute itself. Link begins the game with four Heart Containers and four Magic Containers and can acquire up to four more of each, permanently increasing his life points and magic points respectively. Other games in The Legend of Zelda series only allow Link to increase his strength through new weapons, items, and Heart Containers. Certain enemies drain Link's experience when they attack, but he will never lose a level once raised. When a game ends or is saved, the cartridge records Link's current ability levels and the number of experience points required for the next increase but resets his accumulated points to zero.

Overworld map and side-scrolling

The Adventure of Link has a dual-mode dynamic of top-down view and side-scrolling view. This duality of either traveling or entering combat is one of many aspects adapted from the role-playing genre. The overworld, the area where the majority of the action occurs in other Zelda games, has a top-down perspective, but it now serves as a navigational map to the other areas. While traversing Hyrule, figures randomly appear around the player: a small blob denoting easy enemies, a large biped denoting harder enemies, and a Fairy to refill Link's health. The game switches to side-scrolling mode when Link steps onto particular spots in the overworld map to enter towns, buildings, or caves, or when he encounters wandering monsters. This mode has most of the action and danger.

Combat system
The Adventure of Link has a more complex combat system than its predecessor. Armed with a sword and shield, Link must alternate between standing and crouching positions to attack enemies and defend himself; for example, the Iron Knuckle enemy changes the height of its attack and its shield depending on Link's current stance, forcing Link to change stances until he has a chance to attack safely. Link has the ability to jump, which can be used for attacking tall or airborne enemies and can be used for evasion. Eventually, he can learn techniques for midair downward and upward stabs.

Magic and special items
Though the Zelda series is based on Link collecting items in order to progress in the game, these special items grant abilities that either remain in permanent use for the rest of the game or can only be activated in the overworld. In place of actively used items, The Adventure of Link features eight magic spells for Link to use during action scenes. Each spell is learned from a different wise man in one of the eight towns within Hyrule. Link often must complete side-quests, such as retrieving lost items, before they will teach him their spells. Some spells and items are necessary for advancing in the game. The Life spell becomes the main means of recovering health during action scenes, because healing Fairies are rare.

Replay
Like its predecessor, The Adventure of Link allows storing up to three game sessions in the cartridge's memory. Once the game has been completed, selecting the corresponding file in the main menu allows starting a new game. This preserves the acquired experience levels, techniques, and magic spellsbut no special items, Heart and Magic containers, or extra lives, which must be obtained again.

Plot

Several years after the events of The Legend of Zelda, the now-16-year-old Link notices a strange mark on the back of his left hand, exactly like the crest of Hyrule. He seeks out Impa, who takes him to the North Castle, where a door has been magically sealed for generations. Impa places the back of Link's left hand on the door, and it opens, revealing a sleeping maiden. Impa tells Link that the maiden is Zelda (not the Zelda from the first game), the princess of Hyrule from long ago, and the origin of the titular "Legend of Zelda". Zelda's brother tried to force her into telling their recently deceased father's secrets concerning the Triforce. Princess Zelda refused to reveal its location, and the prince's wizard friend, in anger, tried to strike her down with a spell. Zelda fell under a powerful sleeping spell, but the wizard was unable to control the wildly arcing magic and was killed by it. The prince, filled with remorse and unable to reverse the spell, had his sister placed in the castle tower, hoping she would one day be awakened. He decreed that princesses born to the royal family from that point on would be named Zelda, in remembrance of this tragedy.

Impa says that the mark on Link's hand means that he is the hero chosen to awaken Zelda. She gives Link a chest containing six crystals and ancient writings that only a great future king of Hyrule can read. Link finds that he can read the document, even though he has never seen the language before; it indicates that the crystals must be set into statues within six palaces scattered across Hyrule. This will open the way to the Great Palace, which contains the Triforce of Courage. Only the power of the combined Triforces can awaken Zelda. Taking the crystals, Link sets out to restore them to their palaces. Meanwhile, Ganon's followers seek to kill Link, as sprinkling his blood on Ganon's ashes will bring Ganon back to life.

Ultimately, Link restores the crystals to the six palaces and enters the Great Palace. After venturing deep inside, Link battles the last of the guardians, a flying creature known as Thunderbird. Afterwards, his true heart is tested by fighting his own shadow (aka doppelgänger Dark Link). Link then claims the Triforce of Courage and returns to Zelda. The three triangles unite into the Triforce, and Link's wish awakens Zelda.

Development and releases

Shigeru Miyamoto, the co-creator of the original The Legend of Zelda, intended to make Zelda II: The Adventure of Link fundamentally different from its predecessor. A new team was assembled to develop the sequel, except for Miyamoto (who is credited with the pseudonym "Miyahon") as the producer and Takashi Tezuka as the story- and scriptwriter. Zelda II: The Adventure of Link had two directors: Tadashi Sugiyama and Yasuhisa Yamamura. Sugiyama is credited with the pseudonym "Sugiyan" as his first major project at Nintendo, and Yamamura is credited with his nickname "Yamahen". Music composer Akito Nakatsuka is credited as "Tsukasan".

The Adventure of Link was originally released on the Japan-only Family Computer Disk System (FDS) before its worldwide release. During 1988, a shortage of ROM chips prevented Nintendo from releasing games according to their original schedules. The delayed products included The Adventure of Link, while the company was preparing to release Super Mario Bros. 2 for the Western audience and decided to delay Super Mario Bros. 3 to 1990 shortly after its release. Like the first Zelda game, the FDS version appears to be an earlier version of the game, with a few obvious differences. In the FDS version the dungeons are all gray or green, whereas in the English cartridge release, each dungeon has a unique color. The two dungeon bosses Carrok and Volvagia (the latter being named Barba in the NES release) have different graphical appearances. The game over screen in the English version features the silhouette of Ganon from the chest up, with the text "Game Over/Return of Ganon", whereas the FDS game over screen is a plain black screen with the text "Return of Ganon/The End". There are some slight additions and differences in the dungeons. Due to the Disk System's additional sound chip, the NES conversion lost some musical elements, especially from the title screen. On the main map, the icons denoting attacking monsters look different. The most significant change is the spending of experience points, as Link's three attributes cost the same, unlike the worldwide release. Leveling up is very different on the FDS version, as the saved game on the disk will only let the attributes levels go as high as whatever is set the lowestfor example, if Life is at 5, Strength is at 4, and Magic is at 1, then it will save all as level 1.

The Adventure of Link was re-released in 2003 on The Legend of Zelda: Collector's Edition disc for the GameCube, and again in 2004 as part of the Classic NES Series for Game Boy Advance, with minor changes. The intro text was changed to read "third Triforce" rather than "No.3 Triforce" and the copyright date was altered to read "1987–2004 Nintendo". The death animation removed flashing colors in an effort to prevent seizures, replacing it with a solid red color.

Zelda II was released as the 100th game on the Wii's Virtual Console in 2007: in Japan on January 23, in Europe and Australia on February 9 and in North America on June 4. The text changes are not present in this version, but it does feature the solid red color in the death animations from the GameCube and Game Boy Advance versions. It was re-released again on the Nintendo 3DS's Virtual Console in September 2011, alongside the first Zelda game, as part of the "3DS Ambassadors" program. It is one of ten NES games for owners who purchased 3DS consoles before the price drop. It was later made available for all 3DS owners in Japan on June 6, 2012, in Europe on September 13, and in North America on November 22. The game was also re-released on the Wii U's Virtual Console in September 2013. It is one of the 30 games in the NES Classic Edition, a miniature replica of the Nintendo Entertainment System, released on November 10, 2016, in Australia and Japan and one day later in North America and Europe.

Reception

Original version
Upon its release in North America, Zelda II was met with mostly positive reviews from critics and became one of the most popular NES games of 1988, with many retailers reporting that the game was selling out that year. The game ultimately sold 4.38 million copies worldwide.

In 1987, Famicom Tsūshin (now Famitsu) gave it a score of 36 out of 40, based on a panel of four reviewers giving it ratings of 8, 10, 9, and 9 out of 10. This made it their second highest-rated game of 1987, behind only Dragon Quest II. These were also the only two games to have received a Famitsu score of 35/40 or above up until 1987. Play magazine praised the unique gameplay, describing it as combination of unique elements that creates an action-RPG experience unlike any other. Nintendo Power said that the game was "an entertaining and natural step in the franchise's evolution", and awarded it the Game of the Year Award for 1988. In 1990, Nintendo Powers special edition Pak Source gave it ratings of 4/5 for Graphic and Sound, 3.5/5 for Play Control, 4.5/5 for Challenge, and 4/5 for Theme Fun. In 1992 Total! magazine awarded an 82% rating, due in great part to mediocre sub-scores for music and graphics. A 1993 review in Dragon by Sandy Petersen, gave 3 out of 5 stars.

In 1997, Electronic Gaming Monthly listed Zelda II as number 72 on its "100 Best Games of All Time", saying that while the other three extant games in the series were better (The Legend of Zelda, A Link to the Past, and Link's Awakening all placed within the top 30), it was still a masterpiece, featuring outstanding gameplay and a much larger quest than its predecessor. Zelda II was rated the 110th best game made on a Nintendo system in Nintendo Powers Top 200 Games list. In August 2008, Nintendo Power listed it as the 12th best Nintendo Entertainment System video game, describing it as a radical and refreshing departure from its predecessor.

Re-releases
IGN said that the game is a "recommended and playable adventure" but also noted that players should not expect the same gameplay from the classic Zelda titles. 1UP.com praised the game's length, saying that the players can find plenty to keep them busy for some time. Kotaku enjoyed the darker spin on the original Zelda, stating that the more detailed graphics and bigger sprites made the enemies to appear more menacing and hostile, also noting that evolved combat system makes enemies to defend themselves, withdraw, or strike strategically, using the environment to their advantage. The game also received some criticism. In a 2007 retrospective, GameSpot said that while the game is "decent enough to make it worth the $5 price [on the Wii's Virtual Console]", it features "questionable design decision[s]" and can get confusing if players don't have the help of walkthroughs. The GBA version of the game has an aggregated score of 73 on Metacritic, which is the lowest score of the Zelda series.

Legacy
The game introduced or expanded many enduring elements of the Zelda series. For example, a greater variety of non-player characters (NPCs) have more pivotal roles in Link's quests. Zelda II is one of the first games with NPCs traveling with their own agendas, giving the world a life of its own rather than being a simple stage for the story to unfold. The use of metered magic and spells has also carried over into other Zelda games. The Triforce of Courage is introduced in The Adventure of Link with an important role in later Zelda games, as it is strongly associated with Link. Dark Link is a version of Link's Shadow that appears in Ocarina of Time, a similar Link clone called Shadow Link appears in Four Swords Adventures, and yet another appears in Spirit Tracks, as well as in A Link Between Worlds.

The Adventure of Link is one of the first games to significantly combine role-playing video game and platforming elements. Over the next few years, a number of Japanese-made games appeared with a similar format; major games such as Cadash (1989) closely resemble The Adventure of Link, with side-scrolling platform stages supplemented by RPG-like statistical systems, weapons, armor, and magic spells.

Most of the sages in Ocarina of Time bear the same names as towns from The Adventure of Link (Rauru, Ruto, Saria, Nabooru, and Darunia; excluding Impa). The town of Mido shares the name of a character in Kokiri Forest. In the in-game chronology, the towns were named after the characters. The Adventure of Link is the only Zelda game of the main English releases not to use "The Legend of Zelda" in its title, the only Zelda game to feature cumulative lives and therefore the only game in the series to include 1-up dolls. The subsequent The Legend of Zelda: A Link to the Past for the Super Famicom in 1991 follows new Link and Zelda characters and returns to the top-down style of the original.

There are a small number of side-scrolling areas in The Legend of Zelda: Link's Awakening, mainly tunnels and caves. The series left the top-down style again in 1998 with Ocarina of Time for Nintendo 64, with 3D graphics. A new version of the composition "Temple", arranged by Shogo Sakai, is featured in Super Smash Bros. Melee, where it is played during the "Hyrule Temple" stage and the "Underground Maze" level. A variation of the track, as well as a new version of the "Great Palace" level song, also appears in Super Smash Bros. Brawl. The track was later once again updated and appeared twice, as the "StreetPass Battle Theme" as well as a slower version for the "Battle Victory" music, in the Nintendo 3DS game A Link Between Worlds. The StreetPass battle mode is itself inspired by the final boss fight of Zelda II; StreetPass fights occur between one player as Link and the other player as Shadow/Dark Link. The Famicom Disk System version of the composition "Battle Theme" was reused as the "Miniboss Theme" in The Legend of Zelda: Minish Cap.

Zelda II was very influential to other NES games like Faxanadu, Moon Crystal, and The Battle of Olympus. The game Shovel Knight pays homage to Zelda IIs iconic  jump. Adventure Time: Hey Ice King! Why'd You Steal Our Garbage?!! was intended to play like Zelda II and pays homage to it.

Notes

References

External links
 

1987 video games
Action role-playing video games
Famicom Disk System games
GameCube games
Game Boy Advance games
Nintendo Entertainment Analysis and Development games
Nintendo Entertainment System games
Nintendo Switch Online games
Side-scrolling platform games
Side-scrolling role-playing video games
Single-player video games
Adventure of Link
Top-down video games
Video game sequels
Video games developed in Japan
Video games produced by Shigeru Miyamoto
Video games scored by Akito Nakatsuka
Video games with oblique graphics
Virtual Console games for Nintendo 3DS
Virtual Console games for Wii
Virtual Console games for Wii U